Arthur Albert St. Maur Mouritz, often credited as A. Mouritz, (1861–1943) was a British physician known for his studies of leprosy in Hawaii. He travelled from England to Hawaii in 1883, and was the resident physician to the Kalaupapa Leper Settlement in Molokai, Hawaii, from 1884 to 1887 or 1888. He found evidence that there were cases of leprosy in Hawaii before 1830.

Mouritz studied how leprosy was spread through experiments on hundreds of native Hawaiians. He and his colleagues received international and long-standing notoriety for their experimental inoculation of leprosy into apparently healthy people. To justify his experiments, Mouritz stated that Hawaiians were the only race not disgusted by leprosy symptoms.

Mouritz's research revealed that leprosy was less contagious than previously thought. He concluded that leprosy could not be spread by insects, casual proximity or inoculation, but only be spread to a healthy person by exposing the mucosa of the digestive tract to the leprosy bacteria. He posed that the bacteria summoned a fermentogen that was only available in susceptible humans, which fed the leprosy. Instead of being moved to free the residents of the isolated leper colony so they could return home to their communities, he justified keeping them confined because he was disgusted by their ugliness.

Mouritz wrote the first American book on Hawaiian leprosy, and later wrote a book about the history of leprosy. He practised medicine for at least 40 years. After leaving Hawaii, he returned to explain the world history of influenza from 1120 B.C. to 1919 A.D., and its causes and treatments. His book The Flu is included in the Surgeon General's Library at the U. S. National Library of Medicine.

See also
Kalaupapa National Historical Park
Father Damien
Leper colony stigma
History of leprosy
Pandemic

Notes

References

External links 
 
 

1943 deaths
1861 births
19th-century English medical doctors
20th-century English medical doctors
British infectious disease physicians
British leprologists
English medical writers
Leprosy in Hawaii
English medical historians